Steel City Trawler is the fourth studio album by Canadian singer-songwriter Luke Doucet, released August 31, 2010 on Six Shooter Records. The album was named as a longlisted nominee for the 2011 Polaris Music Prize.

Track listing

References

Luke Doucet albums
Six Shooter Records albums
2010 albums